Matthew Wilhelm is a New Hampshire politician.

Education
Wilhelm earned an M.A. in public administration from the Carsey School of Public Policy at the University of New Hampshire.

Career
On November 6, 2018, Wilhelm was elected to the New Hampshire House of Representatives where he represents the Hillsborough 42 district. Wilhelm assumed office on December 5, 2018. Wilhelm is a Democrat.

Personal life
Wilhelm resides in Manchester, New Hampshire. Wilhelm is married and has two children.

References

21st-century American politicians
Democratic Party members of the New Hampshire House of Representatives
Living people
Politicians from Manchester, New Hampshire
Year of birth missing (living people)